Roger François (7 October 1900 – 15 February 1949) was a French weightlifter. He competed at the 1924, 1928 and 1932 Summer Olympics in the middleweight category (under 75 kg) and finished in sixth, first and fourth place, respectively. François won the world title in 1922 and set seven world records between 1922 and 1928: two in the press, four in the snatch, and one in the total. Four of those records were unofficial.

References

1900 births
1949 deaths
People from Romans-sur-Isère
French male weightlifters
Olympic weightlifters of France
Weightlifters at the 1924 Summer Olympics
Weightlifters at the 1928 Summer Olympics
Weightlifters at the 1932 Summer Olympics
Olympic gold medalists for France
World record setters in weightlifting
Olympic medalists in weightlifting
Medalists at the 1928 Summer Olympics
Sportspeople from Drôme
20th-century French people